Edmund Byrne (1656-1724) was the Roman Catholic Archbishop of Dublin from 1707 until his death.

Bryne was born in Borris, County Carlow. He entered the Irish College in Seville (1674), where he was ordained on 18 March 1679. He was parish priest at  St. Nicholas, Dublin.  Dr Donnelly was appointed archbishop on 15 March 1707 and consecrated on 31 August 1707, in Newgate gaol by Bishop Patrick Donnelly of Dromore.

References

People from County Carlow
18th-century Roman Catholic archbishops in Ireland
Roman Catholic archbishops of Dublin
1724 deaths
1656 births